Mount Nanren Ecological Reserve Area is a nature reserve in Kenting National Park, Manzhou Township, Pingtung County, Taiwan.

History
The reserve was established in 1995. The reserve was closed from May until end of 2008.

Geology
The reserve spans over an area of 5,800 hectares. It features three lakes, which are the main water body, Nanren Lake and Yilan Lake.

See also
 Geography of Taiwan

References

1995 establishments in Taiwan
Geography of Pingtung County
Nature reserves in Taiwan
Protected areas established in 1995
Tourist attractions in Nantou County